Presidential and vice-presidential elections were held in Brazil on 1 March 1922. The result was a victory for Artur Bernardes of the Mineiro Republican Party, who received 56% of the vote.

Results

President

Vice-president

Aftermath
Urbano Santos died before being sworn in as Vice President. A second vice-presidential election was held on 22 August, which was won by Estácio Coimbra.

References

Presidential elections in Brazil
Brazil
1922 in Brazil
March 1922 events
Election and referendum articles with incomplete results
Elections of the First Brazilian Republic